VRD may mean:

Virtual retinal display, technology to display directly onto the retina
Volunteer Reserve Decoration, medal of RNVR and RNZNVR
 Virgin America, ICAO airline code
 Victoria River Downs Airport, Australia, IATA code
 Vacation rental dwelling, only used in Lincoln City, Oregon, US (population 8,000)